Empress Dowager Zhang (personal name unknown) (died  313), formally Empress Guangxian (literally "the rebuilding and wise empress"), was an empress dowager of the Xiongnu-led Han Zhao dynasty of China, during the reign of her son Liu Cong (Emperor Zhaowu).

She was the founding emperor Liu Yuan's concubine.  Her son Liu Cong was Liu Yuan's fourth son, and it is not known whether she bore other children for Liu Yuan.  When Liu Cong seized the throne in 310 after overthrowing his older brother Liu He (after Liu He had tried to have him and the other brothers killed and successfully killed two), he honored both her and Liu Yuan's wife, Empress Dan, empresses dowager -- Empress Dan with the greater title of Huangtaihou (皇太后) and her with the lesser title of Ditaihou (帝太后).  When Empress Dowager Dan died later that year, however, she received the greater title of Huangtaihou.

She was known only for a few incidents during her stint as empress dowager.  In 312, at her insistence, Liu Cong took two daughters of his cousin (and therefore her nephew) Zhang Shi (張寔) as his concubines.  Later that year, when Liu Cong was wrongly punishing the official Wang Zhang (王彰) for trying to persuade him to be milder in his temper and actions, Empress Dowager Zhang protested by fasting for three days, eventually helping to correct Liu Cong's behavior for a time.  Yet later that year, when Liu Cong was set to create his concubine Liu Ying (劉英) as empress, Empress Zhang insisted against it and for her grandniece Zhang Huiguang, whom Liu Cong then formally created empress in early 313.  Three months later, Empress Dowager Zhang died and was honored with a posthumous empress title. Her grandniece the empress mourned her so greatly and was so depressed that she died as well.

References 

313 deaths
Former Zhao people
Sixteen Kingdoms empresses dowager
4th-century Chinese women
4th-century Chinese people
Year of birth unknown